Thursday is the second mixtape by Canadian singer the Weeknd. It was released on August 18, 2011, by XO. Like his debut mixtape House of Balloons (2011), the Weeknd collaborated with producers and songwriters Doc McKinney and Illangelo; the duo produced Thursday in its entirety, and it contains fewer samples than its predecessor. Recorded in Toronto, the mixtape is also notable for its guest appearance from Canadian rapper Drake. 

Thursday has an unconventional and diverse musical style, drawing on downtempo, dubstep, dream pop, hip hop, rock, and reggae music. It contains similar themes to his previous works, exploring the Weeknd's drug use, libertinism, and experiences with love and newfound fame. He titled the mixtape as a reference to a contentious open relationship he had with a former lover. 

Thursday received critical acclaim, who drew comparisons to House of Balloons. It was later commercially released as part of the compilation album Trilogy (2012), and included the single "The Zone" with Drake. On its tenth anniversary, the original mixes were released alongside a limited edition line of merchandise designed by artist Mr. Yanen.

Critical reception

Thursday received critical acclaim. At Metacritic, which assigns a normalized rating out of 100 to reviews from mainstream publications, the mixtape received an average score of 80, based on 17 reviews. Evan Rytlewski of The A.V. Club said, "It's a rare songwriter who can craft music that's so repellent yet also so irresistible." Winston Robbins of Consequence of Sound said, "Despite the ridiculously high highs of this album, it fails to maintain a great pace throughout. It struggles back and forth between "good" and "great," whereas its foregoer grabbed "great" by the balls on the first track and never let go." Benjamin Boles of Now said, "It's not quite perfect: his voice is the star of the show but is occasionally buried under the clever beats and production. But that's a small complaint about someone who's looking more and more like one of the most exciting artists to emerge this year." Q magazine stated, "Toronto outfit, The Weeknd, has been hailed as one of the most exciting new sounds in modern R&B -- hype that, on the basis of this equally startling follow-up, seems entirely justified." Brandon Soderberg of Pitchfork said, "Though there's less breathing space on Thursday, and fewer melodic hooks, it still feels of a piece with House of Balloons."

BBC Music's Mike Diver made a positive review, saying, "File him beside Frank Ocean as an R&B star set to climb to new heights in 2012." Matthew Cole of Slant Magazine wrote, "The Weeknd is in full command of his craft, and at this point it's almost impossible for me to imagine that he won't deliver on the finale. He's earned my trust, as would any other artist who had already released two of the year's best albums." Tyler Fisher of Sputnikmusic said, "Listening to something like Thursday is the ultimate form of escapism that so many of us flock to music for. That's a quality that should be celebrated, not criticized for its lack of immediate pleasure." Jody Rosen of Rolling Stone gave a mixed review, commenting, "While it's refreshing to hear an R&B singer emphasizing the psychic toll of libertinism, his angst sex grows tiresome. Once in a while, can't this dude just get laid, and have fun doing it?"

Track listing
All tracks produced by Doc McKinney and Illangelo.

Sample credits
"Life of the Party" contains elements of "Drugs in My Body", performed by Thieves Like Us.
"The Birds Part 2" contains elements of "Sandpaper Kisses", performed by Martina Topley-Bird.

Charts

Release history

References 

The Weeknd albums
2011 mixtape albums
Sequel albums
Albums produced by Illangelo